Sud Radio Transmitter Pic Blanc is a facility for high power medium wave broadcasting located on Pic Blanc, a  mountain at 1°43'1"E and 42°32'5"N in Andorra.  Whilst in operation, it was the highest medium wave transmitting station in Europe. It was built in 1972 by Sud Radio and uses a directional antenna consisting of two free-standing 86 metre tall lattice towers. One of these towers is insulated against ground, while the other one is grounded and carries a cage aerial.

The transmitter worked on 819 kHz with a power of 900 kilowatts. It was shut down in November 1981. As replacement, a small transmitter at Gauré near Toulouse was built.

Now the facility is abandoned and one of the two towers has been partly dismantled.

See also
 List of towers

References

External links
 http://perso.wanadoo.fr/tvignaud/galerie/etranger/and-sudradio.htm
 http://www.skyscraperpage.com/diagrams/?b58031
 http://www.skyscraperpage.com/diagrams/?b58032

Radio masts and towers in Europe
Buildings and structures in Andorra
Towers in France
Transmitter sites in France
Towers completed in 1972
1972 establishments in Andorra